Marty Hurney (born December 20, 1955) is an American football executive who is the executive vice president of football for player personnel for the Washington Commanders of the National Football League (NFL). He previously served as an administrator for the San Diego Chargers in the 1990s before working as the general manager of the Carolina Panthers throughout much of the 2000s and 2010s. Prior to becoming a football executive, Hurney was a sportswriter for Washington, D.C. based newspapers in the 1980s.

Early years
Hurney was born on December 20, 1955, and grew up in Wheaton, Maryland. He attended Our Lady of Good Counsel High School before attending Catholic University of America, where he played as an offensive guard for their football team before stopping after his sophomore year to focus on writing about sports for their student newspaper The Tower. He graduated with a Bachelor of Arts degree in general studies in 1978.

Executive career

Early career
Hurney worked as a sportswriter for The Washington Star from 1978 until the publication folded in 1981. He then worked as a beat reporter covering the Washington Redskins for The Washington Times before joining the team's public relations department in 1988. In 1990, he followed former Redskin general manager Bobby Beathard to the San Diego Chargers where he worked primarily on administrative duties such as organizing internal departments and negotiating player contracts.

Carolina Panthers
Hurney joined the Carolina Panthers in 1998 as their director of football administration before being named the director of player operations the following season. He was promoted to general manager in 2002, a position he held until being fired midway through the 2012 season. His time with the team oversaw several All-Pro players drafted by him, such as defensive end Julius Peppers, quarterback Cam Newton, and linebackers Luke Kuechly and Thomas Davis Sr.

In July 2017, after general manager and successor Dave Gettleman was fired by the Panthers, Hurney was re-hired to serve as the team's interim general manager. In February 2018, he was placed on paid administrative leave as the NFL began an investigation into whether he had violated the league's personal conduct policy. He was reinstated by the Panthers later that month after no evidence was found and was subsequently named the fulltime general manager. He was fired again by the team in December 2020 over differences with newly appointed owner David Tepper and head coach Matt Rhule.

Washington Football Team / Commanders
On January 22, 2021, Hurney was hired by the Washington Commanders as their executive vice president of football for player personnel.

Radio
Hurney owns WZGV, an ESPN Radio affiliate based in Charlotte. He bought the station following his first dismissal from the Panthers in 2012.

References

External links
 Washington Commanders bio

1955 births
American sportswriters
Carolina Panthers executives
Catholic University Cardinals football players
Catholic University of America alumni
Living people
National Football League general managers
People from Wheaton, Maryland
San Diego Chargers executives
Sportspeople from Charlotte, North Carolina
Sportswriters from Maryland
The Washington Star people
The Washington Times people
Washington Football Team executives
Washington Commanders executives